Peblephaeus yayeyamai is a species of beetle in the family Cerambycidae. It was described by Stephan von Breuning in 1955, originally under the genus Blepephaeus.

Subspecies
 Peblephaeus yayeyamai caesius Takakuwa, 1984
 Peblephaeus yayeyamai yayeyamai (Breuning, 1955)

References

Lamiini
Beetles described in 1955